Kobylanka may refer to the following places:
Kobylanka, Lesser Poland Voivodeship (south Poland)
Kobylanka, Masovian Voivodeship (east-central Poland)
Kobylanka, Podlaskie Voivodeship (north-east Poland)
Kobylanka, West Pomeranian Voivodeship (north-west Poland)